The 1974–75 Winnipeg Jets season was the Jets' third season of operation in the World Hockey Association (WHA). The club finished third in the Canadian Division and missed the playoffs.

Offseason

Regular season

Final standings

Schedule and results

Playoffs

Player statistics

Awards and records

Transactions

Draft picks
Winnipeg's draft picks at the 1974 WHA Amateur Draft.

Farm teams

See also
1974–75 WHA season

References

External links

Winnipeg Jets (1972–1996) seasons
Winn
Winn